Gemini Wars is a 2012 space real-time strategy computer game developed and published by American studio Camel101.

History
Gemini Wars was released on June 8, 2012, and will be available on Microsoft Windows and OS X.

Story
In the game, the player controls a fleet commander and rises up through the ranks of the US Federation Forces. Players begin with a small group of frigates. Players have to control battleships, carriers and planetary bases throughout space battles and boarding actions. Players can also build space stations with orbital facilities to fortify their position, build their fleet, extract minerals and research upgrades. Players must execute all boarding actions using Marine Special Forces and will have to bombard enemies with long-range cannons.

Reception
Gemini wars received generally mixed or negative reviews, currently holding a 51.50% score on gamerankings and 53% metacritic score with a 6,5 user rating. Critics often moaned the slow pace, bugs and lack of a multiplayer mode but some praised the story. Destructoid and 4players.de called it frustrating while XGN said "Players who love RTS-games with a nice story will however enjoy Gemini Wars."

References

External links
Camel101 Official Website

2012 video games
Video games developed in the United States
Windows games
MacOS games
Iceberg Interactive games
Real-time strategy video games
Video games set in outer space